Rodéo may refer to:

 Rodéo (riot), rioting-related body of strategy and tactics
 Titled works: 
 Rodéo (Lucky Luke), 1949 in the Lucky Luke series
 Rodéo (Zazie album), 2004 music album by singer-songwriter Zazie

See also
 Rodeo, primarily North-American and Australian sport
 Rodeo (disambiguation)